Budyonnovsk is a town in Stavropol Krai, Russia. Population:

History
The town was founded in 1799 by Armenian settlers from Derbent. During World War II, Budyonnovsk was occupied by German troops from August 18, 1942 to January 10, 1943.

The Budyonnovsk hospital hostage crisis took place here in June 1995.

Administrative and municipal status
Within the framework of administrative divisions, Budyonnovsk serves as the administrative center of Budyonnovsky District, even though it is not a part of it. As an administrative division, it is incorporated separately as the town of krai significance of Budyonnovsk—an administrative unit with the status equal to that of the districts. As a municipal division, the town of krai significance of Budyonnovsk is incorporated within Budyonnovsky Municipal District as Budyonnovsk Urban Settlement.

Climate
Budyonnovsk has a humid continental climate (Köppen: Dfa) with low precipitation, much sunlight and large differences between summer and winter. The town experiences some of the hottest summers in Russia. Although precipitation is relatively low, the proximity of the Caspian sea brings significant humidity, causing a steamy summer heat.

Military
An airbase is located 14 km (9 miles) northwest of the town.

Religion
Three Armenian churches were torn down by Soviet authorities during the Soviet period. On July 1, 2010, a new Holy Ascension Armenian apostolic church was opened in Budyonnovsk.

References

Notes

Sources

External links
Official website of Budyonnovsk 
Budyonnovsk Business Directory 

Cities and towns in Stavropol Krai
Stavropol Governorate
Populated places established in 1799